The yellow-throated hanging parrot (Loriculus pusillus) is a small species of parrot in the family Psittaculidae. It is endemic to the Indonesian islands of Java and Bali. It is found in forest and adjacent habitats. It is threatened by habitat loss.

References

Yellow-throated
Birds of Bali
Birds of Java
Endemic fauna of Indonesia
Yellow-throated hanging
Near threatened animals
Near threatened biota of Asia
yellow-throated hanging parrot
yellow-throated hanging parrot
Taxonomy articles created by Polbot